Ludwig Franzisket (born 26 June 1917 in Düsseldorf – died 23 November 1988 in Münster) was a German World War II Luftwaffe fighter ace. A flying ace or fighter ace is a military aviator credited with shooting down five or more enemy aircraft during aerial combat. He scored all of his 43 victories against the Western Allies in over 500 combat missions whilst flying the Messerschmitt Bf 109. He was also a recipient of the Knight's Cross of the Iron Cross. After the war, he became a professor and director of the Westfälisches Museum für Naturkunde.

Early life and military career
Franzisket was born on 26 June 1917 in Düsseldorf, at the time in the Rhine Province, the westernmost province of the Kingdom of Prussia. He initially served with Jagdgeschwader 26 (JG 26—26th Fighter Wing) prior to the out break of war, and then transferred 1./Jagdgeschwader 1 (JG 1—1st Fighter Wing) on the 1 August 1939.

World War II
World War II in Europe began on Friday, 1 September 1939, when German forces invaded Poland. On 11 May 1940, Franzisket claimed his first two victories, ending the French campaign with nine aerial victories. On 9 July, 1./JG 1 was redesignated and became 7./JG 27.

On 1 October 1940 Franzisket was appointed Adjutant of I./Jagdgeschwader 27 (JG 27—27th Fighter Wing). Franzisket had achieved 14 victories at the time of the units relocation to North Africa. A notable success in this period occurred on 14 June 1941 when Franzisket intercepted and shot down South African ace Captain Kenneth Driver. The air battle was fought singularly, in a one-versus-one situation. Both men fired at each other, but only the German scored hits. Franzisket got too close and struck Driver's tail with a wing tip ,damaging it. Franzisket remained ignorant of the collision, as did Driver, who was preparing to bail out, until after they met. Franzisket showed Driver around the damaged Bf 109. Driver showed Franzisket a picture and lock of hair belonging to his girlfriend who had come to visit him in Cairo. The German promised to have a message dropped via container over his airfield informing her that Driver lived.  Oberleutnant (First Lieutenant) Franzisket was awarded the Knight's Cross of the Iron Cross on 20 July for 22 victories in 204 missions.

Franzisket was appointed Staffelkapitän (squadron leader) of 1. Staffel JG 27 on 5 December 1941. With his score at 39, Frankisket was shot down on 29 October 1942 by Royal Air Force (RAF) Spitfires. As he bailed out of Messerschmitt Bf 109 (Werknummer 10616—factory number) he struck the vertical stabilizer, a fate suffered by his close friend and fellow ace Hans-Joachim Marseille just four weeks before, breaking his leg. Marseille had not been as fortunate to survive the accident and was killed. Franzisket was tasked with recovery of Marseille's body from the desert.

Franzisket summed up his view of the air war over North Africa after the war:

In the air we were superior to the British fighter aircraft [Hurricanes] particularly in 1941. The Curtiss Tomahawks and Kittyhawks were much better aircraft, but the Bf 109F had the better performance at high altitude. Over and above, our tactics seemed to be better than the British, but on the other hand, the ever-growing superiority in numbers of the RAF was the reason why JG 27 was from the summer, 1942 onwards, more and more decimated and weakened. Negative points were the enormous technical difficulties and the lack of supply. An important but not decisive psychological factor was the news of the immense super-victories of the German pilots in Russia. But we all had the feeling that these victories were gained much more easily than ours. I never envied the German Jagdgeschwadern on the Channel front; I have a very unpleasant memory of my own tour of several months over England, and therefore had the highest respect for the results of the pilots on the Western front."

After recovering Franzisket led 1./Ergänzungs-Jagdgruppe Süd—a supplementary training unit—from 1 July 1943 and was then appointed Gruppenkommandeur (group commander) of I./JG 27 based in Germany, defending against the United States Army Air Forces (USAAF).

In May 1944, the Allies initiated the Oil Campaign of World War II, targeting various facilities supplying Germany with petroleum, oil, and lubrication products. On 12 May, the Eighth Air Force sent an attack force of 886 heavy bombers, protected by 980 escort fighters, against the German refineries in central Germany at Leuna, Merseburg, Böhlen and Zeitz. That day, Franzisket's Bf 109 G-6/U4 (Werknummer 441097) was shot down and severely wounded in combat with the bombers, forcing him to bail out near Frankfurt. Subsequently he surrendered command of I. Gruppe to Hauptmann Ernst Börngen.
On 15 December 1944 Franzisket joined the Geschwaderstab of JG 27, and then was appointed Geschwaderkommodore of JG 27 on 30 December 1944.

Franzisket surrendered with the remnants of his unit to American Forces at Salzburg, Austria on 8 May 1945. His younger brother Max, born 22 August 1918 in Düsseldorf, was a Hauptmann and Gruppenkommandeur of the I./Zerstörergeschwader 1 (ZG 1—1st Destroyer Wing) and was killed in action on 19 July 1943 on the Eastern Front.

Academic career
After World War II Ludwig Franzisket went to the University of Münster and attained a Doctor of Philosophy (German: Doktor abbreviated Dr.) in Biology. He later became a Professor and director of the Westfälisches Museum für Naturkunde. He died aged 71 on 23 November 1988 in Münster.

Summary of career

Aerial victory claims
Mathews and Foreman, authors of Luftwaffe Aces: Biographies and Victory Claims, researched the German Federal Archives and found records for 39 aerial victory claims, plus four further unconfirmed claims. All of his aerial victories were claimed on the Western Front and include three four-engined bombers.

Awards
 Iron Cross (1939) 2nd and 1st Class
 Honour Goblet of the Luftwaffe (Ehrenpokal der Luftwaffe) on 20 October 1940
 Knight's Cross of the Iron Cross on 20 July 1941 as Oberleutnant and adjudant of the I./JG 27
 German Cross in Gold on 12 January 1943 as Hauptmann in the I./JG 27

Works
 The Atrophy of Hermatypic Reef Corals Maintained in Darkness and their Subsequent Regeneration in Light.
 Die Geschichte des Lebens. Verl. Natur u. Heimat, 1966.
 Die Geschichte des Westfälischen Landesmuseums für Naturkunde. Landesmuseum f. Naturkunde, 1967.

Notes

References

Citations

Bibliography

 
 
 
 
 
 
 
 
 
 
 
 
 
 
 
 
 

1917 births
1988 deaths
Military personnel from Düsseldorf
People from the Rhine Province
Luftwaffe pilots
German World War II flying aces
Recipients of the Gold German Cross
Recipients of the Knight's Cross of the Iron Cross
University of Münster alumni